A Greyhound Of A Girl is an upcoming animated film, directed by Enzo D'Alò that is a co-production between seven European countries. It is an adaptation of the 2011 novel of the same name by Roddy Doyle by D'Alò and Dave Ingham. It has a voice cast that includes Sharon Horgan and Brendan Gleeson. It premiered at the Berlin Film Festival in February 2023.

Synopsis
Mary is an eleven year old girl with a passion for cooking absorbing information from her grandmother who is a wonderful cook. However, Mary and her family must come to terms with her granny's illness.

Cast
 Mia O'Connor as Mary 
 Sharon Horgan as Mary's mother
 Brendan Gleeson as Paddy
 Rosaleen Linehan as Emer
 Charlene McKenna as Tansey

Production
An adaptation by Dave Ingham and D'Alò from the 2011 novel by Roddy Doyle, design is by Peter De Sève The project has been produced across seven European counties (Estonia, Germany, Ireland, Italy, Latvia, Luxembourg and the United Kingdom) by Paul Thiltges Distributions, Aliante, Jam Media, Rija Films, Amrion Production, Fish Blowing Bubbles.

Release
The film will be screened at the 73rd Berlin International Film Festival in February 2023 as part of the Generation Kplus 2023 programme.

References

External links

2023 films
Films directed by Enzo D'Alò